Unbridled was an American Thoroughbred racehorse.

Unbridled may also refer to:

 Unbridled (2017 film), a film directed by John David Ware
 Unbridled (2018 film), a Spanish-Italian thriller film
 Unbridled (novel), a 2007 novel by Jude Dibia